New Wave is a notable punk/new wave/proto-punk compilation album released in 1977 on Vertigo Records.  It introduced many US new wave artists to the UK market and helped establish the term "new wave".  The album was compiled by Alan Cowderoy for Phonogram Ltd. (London) and most of the artists were on Phonogram subsidiary labels, making it essentially a sampler album. The album credits give thanks to Linda and Seymour Stein from Sire Records and Jake Riviera and Kosmo Vinyl from Stiff Records.  Music critic Ira Robbins rated it one of his top ten albums of 1977.

While most of the acts on the album were US acts, it also included acts from the UK (The Damned), Ireland (The Boomtown Rats), France (Little Bob Story) and Australia (Skyhooks).

The front cover depicts a punk spitting beer.  The punk in the photo is Derek Gibbs, vocalist for the London-based punk band The Satellites.  Also seen in the background of the photo is the Satellites' bass player, John Johnson. The rear cover has 11 photos of punks posing in colourful clothing.  All the photos were taken by Peter 'Kodick' Gravelle who was one of the first punk photographers, shooting record sleeve photos for the Damned, Generation X, Skrewdriver, Chelsea and others.

Credits
 Compiled By – Alan Cowderoy
 Photography By – Peter Kodick
 Sleeve – Dennis Walden, Sue Dubois

Track listing

References

New wave compilation albums
Punk rock compilation albums
1977 compilation albums
Vertigo Records compilation albums